"The Chaser" (Korean: 추격자; RR: Chugyeogja) is a song recorded by South Korean boy group Infinite. It was released as the second single from the group's third extended play Infinitize, which was released through Woollim Entertainment on May 15, 2012. The song received critical acclaim, and was named the third best K-pop song of the 2010s by Billboard as well as one of Rolling Stones best boy band songs of all time.

Reception

Music video and promotion 
A teaser video of the song "The Chaser" was released on May 11, on Woollim Entertainment's YouTube account. The music video premiered exclusively at Infinite's Showcase: The Mission, on May 15. After the showcase in Seoul, the music video was available on Woolim Entertainment's YouTube account, on their official website and on LOEN Entertainment's YouTube account. Domestic promotions for "The Chaser" on weekly music programs began on May 17 on Mnet's M! Countdown.

Accolades

Charts

Weekly charts

Year-end charts

References 

2012 singles
Infinite (group) songs
2012 songs
Korean-language songs